"A Maiden's Prayer" (original Polish title: "" Op. 4, French: "") is a composition of Polish composer Tekla Bądarzewska-Baranowska (1834–1861), which was published in 1856 in Warsaw, and then as a supplement to the Revue et gazette musicale de Paris in 1859. The piece is a medium difficulty short piano piece for intermediate pianists. Some have liked it for its charming and romantic melody; others have described it as "sentimental salon tosh." The pianist and academic Arthur Loesser described it as "this dowdy product of ineptitude."

In country music

The American musician Bob Wills heard "Maiden's Prayer" played on a fiddle while he was a barber in Roy, New Mexico, and arranged the piece in the Western swing style. Wills first recorded it as an instrumental in 1935 (Vocalion 03924, released in 1938), and it quickly became one of his signature tunes. Later, it became a standard recorded by many country artists, including Buck Owens on his number-one 1965 album I've Got a Tiger By the Tail. The tune is still a standard in the repertoire of Western swing bands.

Wills wrote lyrics for "Maiden's Prayer" and recorded it again in 1941 (Okeh 06205) with vocals by Tommy Duncan. His lyrics reflect the title, and the song, as written by Wills, opens with:
Twilight falls, evening shadows find,
There 'neath the stars, a maiden so fair divine.
The moon on high seemed to see her there.
In her eyes is a light, shining ever so bright,
She whispered a silent prayer.

"Maiden's Prayer" was released in May 1941, and quickly hit number 1 on June 28, 1941, in The Billboard's "Hillbilly and Foreign Record Hits Of the Month".

Relatively few country singers have covered "Maiden's Prayer" with vocals, but they include Ray Price on his tribute album San Antonio Rose (1962) and Willie Nelson on his album Red Headed Stranger (on the 2000 CD reissue but not the 1975 LP). Both singers used the lyrics written by Wills with minor variations, e.g. the maiden is an Indian in Price's version. Also the Everly Brothers recorded a rendition of the song in 1973.

Wills recorded the song a third time on the 1963 album Bob Wills Sings and Plays. When he was inducted into the Nashville Songwriters Hall of Fame in 1970, "Maiden's Prayer" was one of the works cited.

In popular media

Probably the most memorable use of "Maiden's Prayer" is in the 1930 opera Rise and Fall of the City of Mahagonny by Kurt Weill and Bertolt Brecht. The song appears midway through act 1; it is played on an out-of-tune piano at a honky-tonk frequented by prostitutes and their clients. Jakob Schmidt, one of the denizens of Mahagonny, refers to the song as "ewige Kunst" ("eternal art").

"Maiden's Prayer" is heard off-stage in act 4 of Three Sisters by Anton Chekhov. "Maiden's Prayer" appears as an insert piano song in the anime series Strawberry Panic. "Maiden's Prayer" is played by garbage trucks in Taiwan. As residents have to take out their own trash, the garbage truck signals everyone to do so with the melody of this piece, along with Beethoven's Für Elise.

The Rodgers and Hart standard "It Never Entered My Mind" refers to this song in the penultimate line.

In the 1955 Italian Scandal in Sorrento film, Antonio and Violante play the tune together on a piano at the very end of the movie

In Nobuhiko Obayashi's 1977 horror movie House, the character Melody plays the opening section of "A Maiden's Prayer" on the piano a few times.

In 1993, the North Korean Wangjaesan Dance Troupe's VHS tape featured this song in electronic arrangement.

In the 2013 television serial The Tunnel, Anglo-French actor and singer Charlotte Gainsbourg performs a voice-over to the tune of the Maiden's Prayer, singing a mixture of French and English:
, closer to me, dear.
 set aside all fear.

Yes, you shall be mine till the end of time.

In literature

The Maiden's Prayer was used in a macabre context in Mary Wilkins Freeman's ghost story The Wind in the Rose-Bush (published 1903), where the main character, roused from sleep by the sound of the melody being played in a seemingly empty house, rushed downstairs to see who was at the piano, only to find that there was no one there.

References

Bibliography
McWhorter, Frankie. Cowboy Fiddler in Bob Wills' Band. University of North Texas Press, 1997. 
Mishler, Craig. The Crooked Stovepipe: Athapaskan Fiddle Music and Square Dancing in Northeast Alaska and Northwest Canada. University of Illinois Press, 1993.

External links

Western swing songs
Songs written by Bob Wills
1856 compositions
1938 songs
1941 singles
Compositions in E-flat major